The CCTV Nanhai Studio is a famous set of film studio in Nanhai District of Foshan, Guangdong, China.

History
Construction begun in July 1996 and completed in August 1998. In August 2016, it was officially approved by the National Tourism Administration for the state 5A-class tourist scenic spot.

Notable films and TV series
Films and TV series that have used the services of the studio include:

References

External links

Buildings and structures in Foshan
Chinese film studios
Culture in Guangdong